Henry Township may refer to:

Illinois
 Henry Township, Marshall County, Illinois

Indiana
 Henry Township, Fulton County, Indiana
 Henry Township, Henry County, Indiana

Iowa
 Henry Township, Plymouth County, Iowa

Kansas
 Henry Township, Ottawa County, Kansas, in Ottawa County, Kansas

Missouri
 Henry Township, Vernon County, Missouri

North Dakota
 Henry Township, Golden Valley County, North Dakota, in Golden Valley County, North Dakota

Ohio
 Henry Township, Wood County, Ohio

South Dakota
 Henry Township, Brown County, South Dakota, in Brown County, South Dakota
 Henry Township, Codington County, South Dakota, in Codington County, South Dakota

Township name disambiguation pages